Dejan Čabraja (born 22 August 1993 in Zagreb) is a Croatian football player who most recently played as a forward for NK Rudeš.

Honours

Player

Club
Široki Brijeg 
Bosnian Cup: 2016–17

References

External links

1993 births
Living people
Footballers from Zagreb
Association football forwards
Croatian footballers
Croatia youth international footballers
GNK Dinamo Zagreb players
NK Sesvete players
NK Lokomotiva Zagreb players
NK Rudeš players
Flamurtari Vlorë players
NK Inter Zaprešić players
NK Lučko players
NK Široki Brijeg players
A.F.C. Tubize players
First Football League (Croatia) players
Croatian Football League players
Premier League of Bosnia and Herzegovina players
Challenger Pro League players
Croatian expatriate footballers
Expatriate footballers in Albania
Expatriate footballers in Belgium
Expatriate footballers in Bosnia and Herzegovina
Croatian expatriate sportspeople in Albania
Croatian expatriate sportspeople in Belgium
Croatian expatriate sportspeople in Bosnia and Herzegovina